Kol Kol-e Olya (also Romanized as Kol Kol-e ‘Olyā; also known as Kolkol) is a village in Sarab Rural District, in the Central District of Eyvan County, Ilam Province, Iran. At the 2006 census, its population was 142, in 32 families. The village is populated by Kurds.

References 

Populated places in Eyvan County
Kurdish settlements in Ilam Province